Ground freezing is a construction technique used in circumstances where soil needs to be stabilized so it will not collapse next to excavations, or to prevent contaminants spilled into soil from being leached away.
Ground freezing has been used for at least one hundred years.

Pipes are run through the soil to be frozen, and then refrigerants are run through the pipes, freezing the soil.
Frozen soil can be as hard as concrete.

Design 
Some ground freezing projects use common salt brine as the refrigerant, but other projects benefit from using more exotic refrigerants, like liquid nitrogen.

Examples 
Soil contaminated with radioactive elements that leaked from Japan's Fukushima Daiichi nuclear power plant was contained through ground freezing.

A project in Boston known as the Big Dig used ground freezing during some of its tunneling, to allow its wide tunnels to be built under or through soil that supported existing infrastructure that would have been difficult or expensive to support using more traditional excavation methods.

In northern Canada and arctic Alaska, passive pipe systems are used that do not require any external power to keep the ground frozen. These systems use in-ground evaporators and above-ground radiators filled with liquid refrigerant. When ambient temperatures fall below ground temperatures, the liquid vapor starts condensing in the radiator, reducing the pressure in the system causing the liquid in the evaporator to boil and evaporate. This process results in heat transfer from the ground to the air and keeps the ground in a permanent frozen state.

See also
 Pykrete, a composite building material which utilizes similar properties in frozen sawdust

References